Blackheart Man is the debut album by Bunny Wailer, originally released on 8 September 1976, in Jamaica on Solomonic Records and internationally on Island Records.

Overview
The songs on the album are regarded as the finest written by Bunny Wailer, and explore themes such as repatriation ("Dreamland"), and his arrest for marijuana possession ("Fighting Against Conviction", originally titled "Battering Down Sentence"). "This Train" is very loosely based on the American gospel standard of the same name. The album features some of Jamaica's leading musicians and also contributions from Bob Marley and Peter Tosh of The Wailers on backing vocals, and the Wailers rhythm section of Carlton and Aston Barrett on some of the tracks. The origins of the album title goes back to Wailer's childhood in the Jamaican countryside, where he grew up in the same village as his friend Bob Marley.
 
Wailer said: 

Bunny Wailer himself considers Blackheart Man to be his best solo album. As he told Jamaican newspaper The Daily Gleaner in June 2009: 

This is one of the three Wailers solo albums released in 1976, along with Peter Tosh's album Legalize It and Bob Marley's Rastaman Vibration.
The album was listed in the 1999 book The Rough Guide: Reggae: 100 Essential CDs.

Release history 
The original LP release of the album was released in two different mixes. The international mix is what is most widely available and has appeared on CD. The Jamaican mix has longer versions of songs and different overdubs. In particular, the Jamaican mix of "This Train" lasts a full minute longer. Although the Jamaican mix has not appeared on CD, it remains a favorite amongst reggae aficionados.

The album has been released on compact disc several times; first in 1989 on Mango Records, then in 2002 on Island in a remastered edition. A new remastering was released on iTunes in 2009, with some of the songs in newly extended and dub versions.

Track listing 
All songs written by Bunny Wailer except where noted

Side one 
 "Blackheart Man" – 6:17
 "Fighting Against Conviction" – 5:11
 "The Oppressed Song" – 3:22
 "Fig Tree" – 3:07
 "Dream Land" (Al "Bunk" Johnson, Wailer) – 2:47

Side two 
 "Rastaman" – 3:51
 "Reincarnated Souls" – 3:43
 "Amagideon (Armagedon)" – 6:46
 "Bide Up" – 2:33
 "This Train" (Wailer, Guthrie) – 8:28

Personnel

Musicians 
 Bunny Wailer – lead vocals, backing vocals, percussion, acoustic guitar, bass guitar, jaw harp
 Carlton "Carly" Barrett – drums
 Aston "Family Man" Barrett – bass, lead guitar, rhythm guitar, keyboards
 Robbie Shakespeare – bass
 Tyrone "Organ D" Downie – keyboards
 Peter Tosh – rhythm guitar, lead guitar, backing vocals, melodica, harmonica
 Earl "Chinna" Smith – lead guitar
 Tommy McCook – flute, saxophone
 "Dirty" Harry Hall – horns
 Bobby Ellis – horns
 Herman Marquis – horns
 Mark West – horns
 Harold Butler – keyboards
 Bernard "Touter" Harvey – keyboards
 Winston Wright – keyboards
 Karl Pitterson – acoustic guitar
 Michael Murray – rhythm guitar
 Eric Frater – lead guitar
 Bob Marley – backing vocals, rhythm guitar
 Franscisco Willie Pep – congas
 Larry McDonald – congas
 Neville Garrick – percussion

Production 
 Bunny Wailer – producer, cover design
 Karl Pitterson – sound engineer, mix engineer
 Chris Blackwell – mix engineer
 Neville Garrick – cover artwork, cover design, photography

References 

1976 debut albums
Bunny Wailer albums
Island Records albums
Mango Records albums